The Zoological Museum of the Patras University is a museum in Patras, Greece.

External links
University of Patras

University museums in Greece
Museums in Patras
University of Patras
Natural history museums in Greece
Zoology museums in Greece
Museums established in 1968